{{DISPLAYTITLE:Rho1 Arietis}}

Rho1 Arietis is the Bayer designation for a star in the northern constellation of Aries, the ram. It has an apparent visual magnitude of 7.01, making it a challenge to see with the naked eye even under ideal dark-sky conditions. Based upon an annual parallax shift measurement of 12.07 mas, it is  distant from the Earth. It is a white-hued A5 main sequence star.

References

External links
 Image Rho1 Arietis

Aries (constellation)
A-type main-sequence stars
Arietis, Rho01
Arietis, 44
013579
018091
Durchmusterung objects